John Hall (23 October 1912 – August 2000) was an English footballer who played as a goalkeeper. Born in Failsworth, Lancashire, he played for Failsworth Dynamoes, Manchester United, Tottenham Hotspur, Stalybridge Celtic and Runcorn, as well as guesting for several teams during the Second World War.

External links
MUFCInfo.com profile

1912 births
People from Failsworth
2000 deaths
English footballers
Manchester United F.C. players
Tottenham Hotspur F.C. players
Stalybridge Celtic F.C. players
Rochdale A.F.C. wartime guest players
Footballers from Oldham
Association football goalkeepers